The county governor of Trøndelag county in Norway represents the central government administration in the county.

The diocesan county called Trondhjems stiftamt was established by the King in 1662, shortly after the area was re-conquered by the Kingdom of Denmark-Norway, taking it back from the Kingdom of Sweden. The seat of the stiftamt was in the city of Trondheim. In 1687, a new subordinate county called Trondhjems amt was created as one of several counties within the diocese. On 24 September 1804, the county was divided by royal resolution into two counties. The county of Nordre Trondhjems amt (renamed Nord-Trøndelag in 1919) was in the north and the county of Søndre Trondhjems amt (renamed Sør-Trøndelag in 1919) was in the south. These two counties existed until 1 January 2018 when the two counties were merged once again into the new Trøndelag county. The new county governor for Trøndelag lives and works in the town of Steinkjer, but also has offices in Trondheim.

The county governor is the government's representative in the county. The governor carries out the resolutions and guidelines of the Storting and government. This is done first by the county governor performing administrative tasks on behalf of the ministries. Secondly, the county governor also monitors the activities of the municipalities and is the appeal body for many types of municipal decisions.

Names
The word for county (amt or fylke) has changed over time. On 1 January 2021, the title was again changed to the gender-neutral .

List of county governors
From 1687 until 1804, the Trondhjems amt county had the following governors. From 1804 to 2017, the county was split and so each of those counties had their own county governor (see the lists for those counties). Since 2018, the counties were reunited with one county governor once again.

References

Trondelag
County Governor